Saint Anthony West is a neighborhood in the Northeast community of Minneapolis, Minnesota

History 
The historic neighborhood was established in 1849 on the banks of the Mississippi River as the Village of Saint Anthony Falls. These falls were seen in 1680 by Father Louis Hennepin, a Franciscan priest who is credited with being the first European to explore the area that is now Minneapolis. He named the falls after his patron saint, St. Anthony of Padua. The neighborhood merged with the new city of Minneapolis in 1872.

Geography
The neighborhood is within walking distance of downtown and the University of Minnesota. St. Anthony West is also host to Boom Island Park, a  riverside park. Broadway Street NE is the northern boundary, and the neighborhood extends to Second Avenue on the south. The Mississippi River makes up the western extent and Washington and Fifth streets NE define the eastern boundary.

Growth
Despite its status as one of the city's oldest neighborhoods, Saint Anthony West is part of the transformation taking place along the river. Developers have discovered Northeast Minneapolis as a prime location for new upscale housing and commercial projects. To balance the new development in other Northeast neighborhoods, St. Anthony West residents in 2004 revived an arrangement with the Minneapolis Park and Recreation Board and the Minnesota Pollution Control Agency to reclaim the  B.F. Nelson site as a public open space along the Mississippi riverfront.

Saint Anthony West is also home to the world headquarters of Graco Inc., a manufacturer of fluid handling systems and components.

Neighborhood Organizations
The Saint Anthony West Neighborhood Organization (STAWNO) is the designated citizen participation organization for the neighborhood. Monthly meetings are open to the public.

Political Representation
Saint Anthony West is represented by the following people:
 Mayor of Minneapolis: Jacob Frey
 Minneapolis City Council (3rd Ward): Steve Fletcher
 Minneapolis Park & Recreation Board (District 1): Chris Meyer
 Hennepin County Commissioner (District 2): Irene Fernando
 Minnesota House of Representatives (District 60A): Sydney Jordan (since February 11, 2020)
 Minnesota Senate (District 60): Kari Dziedzic 
 US House of Representatives (District 5): Ilhan Omar
 US Senate: Amy Klobuchar, Tina Smith

See also 
Neighborhoods of Minneapolis
Northeast Minneapolis

References

External links
Minneapolis Neighborhood Profile - St. Anthony West
St. Anthony West Neighborhood Organization

Neighborhoods in Minneapolis
Minnesota populated places on the Mississippi River